Oisín Kelly (17 May 1915 – 12 October 1981) was an Irish sculptor.

Life and career
Oisín Kelly was born as Austin Kelly in Dublin, the son of William Kelly, principal of the James Street National School, and his wife, Elizabeth (née McLean). He studied languages at Trinity College, Dublin. Until he became an artist in residence at the Kilkenny Design Centre in 1966, he worked as a teacher of Art, English, Irish and French from 1943 to 1964 at St Columba's College, Dublin. He initially attended night class at the National College of Art and Design and studied briefly in 1948–1949 under Henry Moore.

He originally concentrated on small wood carvings and his early commissions were mostly for Roman Catholic churches. He became well known after he was commissioned to do a sculpture, The Children of Lir (1964), for Dublin's Garden of Remembrance, opened in 1966 on the 50th anniversary of the Easter Rising. More public commissions followed, including the  statue of James Larkin on Dublin's O'Connell Street.

He figures in five lines of Seamus Heaney's second "Glanmore Sonnet":"'These things are not secrets but mysteries',/Oisin Kelly told me years ago/In Belfast, hankering after stone/That connived with the chisel, as if the grain/Remembered what the mallet tapped to know."

Works on display
 The Children of Lir (1964) Garden of Remembrance, Dublin 1
 Two Working Men (1969) by County Hall, Cork
 Roger Casement (1971) Banna Strand, Co. Kerry
 Jim Larkin (1977) O'Connell Street, Dublin 1
 Chariot of Life (1982) Irish Life Centre, Lower Abbey Street, Dublin 1

See also
 List of public art in Dublin
 List of public art in Cork city

Sources
 Fergus Kelly (2015) The Life and Work of Oisín Kelly. Hacketstown, Co Carlow: Derreen Books.
 Fergus Kelly (2002) Kelly, Oisín, The Encyclopedia of Ireland. Dublin: Gill and Macmillan.
 Judith Hill (1998) Irish public sculpture. Dublin: Four Courts Press.

References

1915 births
1981 deaths
Schoolteachers from Dublin (city)
Irish sculptors
Artists from Dublin (city)
20th-century sculptors